John Randall Walker (February 23, 1874 – July 21, 1942) was a U.S. political figure from the state of Georgia. Walker was born near Blackshear, Georgia in 1874 and graduated from the Jasper Normal College in Jasper, Florida. He then studied law at the University of Georgia School of Law and graduated with a Bachelor of Laws (LL.B.) degree in 1898.

In 1912, Walker was elected to the 63rd United States Congress as a Democratic member of the United States House of Representatives and served two additional terms in that seat until losing his bid for renomination in 1918.  He died in Blackshear on July 21, 1942, and was buried in a family cemetery in Pierce County, Georgia.

References

History of the University of Georgia, Thomas Walter Reed,  Imprint:  Athens, Georgia : University of Georgia, ca. 1949, pp.1748

1874 births
1942 deaths
People from Pierce County, Georgia
Democratic Party members of the Georgia House of Representatives
Georgia (U.S. state) lawyers
University of Georgia alumni
Democratic Party members of the United States House of Representatives from Georgia (U.S. state)